Kinniya Central College is a National School in Trincomalee District, Sri Lanka. It was established in 1958 and has since become a highly respected educational institution in the region. The school has a student population of over 2100, with more than 130 qualified teachers.

Kinniya Central College is divided into three sections: primary, secondary, and advanced level. The primary division provides education for children from grades 1 to 5. The secondary division caters to students from grades 6 to 11. The advanced level stream offers courses in Bioscience, Physical Science, Arts, Commerce, Biotechnology, and Engineering Technology.

The school has a strong reputation for academic excellence and has achieved high rankings in national and regional examinations. Many of its students have gone on to pursue successful careers in various fields, including medicine, engineering, law, and business.

In addition to academic achievements, Kinniya Central College has also excelled in sports and aesthetic competitions. The school has produced many talented athletes and artists who have represented the school and the region at national and international events.

Kinniya Central College is committed to providing a well-rounded education that prepares students for life beyond the classroom. The school offers a range of extracurricular activities, including sports, music, drama, and debate. These activities help students develop important life skills such as teamwork, leadership, and communication.

Overall, Kinniya Central College is a highly respected educational institution in Sri Lanka. Its commitment to academic excellence, sports, and aesthetics has made it one of the leading schools in the Eastern Province.

External links
Official site

Educational institutions established in 1958
National schools in Sri Lanka
Schools in Trincomalee District
1958 establishments in Ceylon